The Fort Worth Fire were a professional ice hockey team in the Central Hockey League.  Their home games were played in the Fort Worth Convention Center Arena.  They began operations in 1992 and ceased operations in 1999.

At the conclusion of the 1996–97 CHL season, the Fort Worth Fire won the league championship in seven games against the Memphis RiverKings in Fort Worth.

External links
  A to Z Encyclopedia of Ice Hockey's entry on the Fort Worth Fire

Ice hockey teams in the Dallas–Fort Worth metroplex
Defunct Central Hockey League teams
Ice hockey clubs established in 1992
Sports clubs disestablished in 1999
Defunct ice hockey teams in Texas
1992 establishments in Texas
1999 disestablishments in Texas
Ice hockey teams in Texas